Bowling competitions at the 2015 Pan American Games in Toronto were held from July 22 to 25 at the Planet Bowl (Pan Am Bowling Centre), due to naming rights the venue was known as the latter for the duration of the games. A total of four events were contested (two each for men and women).

During the men's doubles event Canadian bowler François Lavoie scored a perfect game in the fifth round, the first in Pan American Games history.

Competition schedule

The following is the competition schedule for the bowling competitions:

Medal table

Medalists

Participation
A total of 15 countries have qualified athletes. The number of athletes a nation has entered is in parentheses beside the name of the country.

Qualification

A total of 56 bowlers will qualify to compete at the Games. Each country is allowed to enter a maximum of two male and two female athletes. Each gender has a quota of 14 nations (28 bowlers) for a total of 56 athletes.

References

 
Events at the 2015 Pan American Games
Pan American Games
2015